Wauponsee Township is one of seventeen townships in Grundy County, Illinois, USA.  As of the 2010 census, its population was 2,423 and it contained 939 housing units.

Geography

Cities, towns, villages
 Morris (south edge)

Unincorporated towns
 Bradley Subdivision at 
 Claypool at 
 Claypool Woods at 
 Gaslight Village at 
 Lori-Sue Subdivision at 
 Paytonville at 
 Pebble Beach at 
 Pine Grove at 
 Pine Meadow Estates at 
 Richards Park at 
 Van Peterson Subdivision at 
 Willow Ridge at 
(This list is based on USGS data and may include former settlements.)

Cemeteries
The township contains Sample Cemetery.

Major highways
  Illinois Route 47

Demographics

School districts
 Coal City Community Unit School District 1
Morris High School and Morris Elementary School District

Political districts
 Illinois's 11th congressional district
 State House District 75
 State Senate District 38

References
 
 United States Census Bureau 2007 TIGER/Line Shapefiles
 United States National Atlas

External links
 City-Data.com
 Illinois State Archives

Townships in Grundy County, Illinois
Townships in Illinois
1849 establishments in Illinois